Bullfinch is a name given to two groups of passerine birds.

True bullfinches
The true bullfinches are thick-billed finches in the passerine family Fringillidae. They comprise the genus Pyrrhula. These birds are distributed across Asia and Europe mainly in temperate forests, and exclude similar-looking birds found in the Americas. They Old World Pyrrhulae include the following:
 Eurasian bullfinch, Pyrrhula pyrrhula
 Brown bullfinch, Pyrrhula nipalensis
 White-cheeked bullfinch, Pyrrhula leucogenis
 Orange bullfinch, Pyrrhula aurantiaca
 Red-headed bullfinch, Pyrrhula erythrocephala
 Grey-headed bullfinch, Pyrrhula erythaca
 Azores bullfinch, Pyrrhula murina

New World tanagers
There is an unrelated group of New World passerine birds also called bullfinches because of their superficial resemblances to the Old World Pyrrhula species. They were placed in the large bunting and American "sparrow" family Emberizidae, but are now considered tanagers (Thraupidae). 

Four are in the genus Loxigilla:
 Puerto Rican bullfinch, Loxigilla portoricensis
 Greater Antillean bullfinch, Loxigilla violacea
 Lesser Antillean bullfinch, Loxigilla noctis
 Barbados bullfinch, Loxigilla barbadensis

In the genus Melopyrrha:
 Cuban bullfinch, Melopyrrha nigra

References

External links
Bullfinch videos, photos and sounds on the Internet Bird Collection

Pyrrhula
Loxigilla
Birds by common name